"When the Grass Grows Over Me" is a song by George Jones.  It was released on the Musicor label in 1968 and rose to #2 on the Billboard country singles chart.  The song is credited to Don Chapel, Tammy Wynette's husband before George, but Tammy claimed that she actually wrote it.  The song is similar in theme to Jones' later comeback hit "He Stopped Loving Her Today" except from a first person point of view, with the narrator claiming he will only stop loving his departed lover when he is dead and buried:

When you left I thought that I would soon be over you
Even told myself that I would find somebody new
Time and tears have come and gone but not your memory
But I'll be over you when the grass grows over me

In 1969, Conway Twitty cut the song for his LP Darlin', You Know I Wouldn't Lie.  A year later, Jerry Lee Lewis recorded it for his album She Even Woke Me Up to Say Goodbye.  Tammy Wynette would also perform the song live occasionally.

1968 songs
George Jones songs
Song recordings produced by Pappy Daily
Musicor Records singles